Branko Radović (December 5, 1933 – November 18, 1993) was a Yugoslav basketball player and coach. He represented the Yugoslavia national team internationally. He is a member of Split Sports Hall of Fame under the name Father of Split's basketball.

Playing career 
Radović started and finished his career with the Split of the Yugoslav First League. In between, he played for the Montažno in Zagreb as well as for the Partizan and the Crvena zvezda in Belgrade.

In 1959 season he was a top scorer with 31 points per game, more than Radivoj Korać. In a game with Lokomotiva Zagreb he scored a record high 64 points.

Yugoslavia national team
As a player for the Yugoslavia national basketball team Radović played 32 games between 1957–1959. He participated at two European Championships (1957 in Bulgaria and 1959 in Turkey) He won a gold medal at the 1959 Mediterranean Games in Lebanon.

Coaching career 
After retiring from his playing career in 1964, Radović became a head coach of the Jugoplastika. He won the first national championship title for Split in 1970–71 season and led them to the 1972 European Champions Cup Finals, where he lost to the Italian team Ignis Varese led by Aleksandar Nikolić. He spent his entire coaching career with team from Split and retired after the 1971–72 season. During that time players of Jugoplastika included Ratomir Tvrdić, Damir Šolman, Petar Skansi and Duje Krstulović.

Career achievements 
 Yugoslav League champion: 1 (with Jugoplastika: 1970–71).
 Yugoslav Cup winner: 2 (with Jugoplastika: 1972).

Individual
 Yugoslav League top scorer: 1 (with Crvena zvezda: 1959)

See also 
 List of Yugoslav First Federal Basketball League annual scoring leaders

References

1933 births
1993 deaths
Competitors at the 1959 Mediterranean Games
Croatian expatriate basketball people in Serbia
Croatian men's basketball players
Croatian basketball coaches
KK Crvena zvezda players
KK Partizan players
KK Split coaches
KK Split players
KK Zrinjevac players
Mediterranean Games gold medalists for Yugoslavia
Basketball players from Dubrovnik
Yugoslav men's basketball players
Yugoslav basketball coaches
Mediterranean Games medalists in basketball
Burials at Lovrinac Cemetery